Calcium(I) chloride (CaCl) is a diatomic molecule observed in certain gases.
A solid with the composition CaCl was reported in 1953; however, later efforts to reproduce this work failed. Molecules of CaCl have been observed in the atmospheres of carbon stars.

References

Calcium compounds
Chlorides
Alkaline earth metal halides